Jackie Levy (born 28 October 1960) is an Israeli politician. He served as a member of the Knesset for Likud, and as Deputy Minister of Construction, before being elected mayor of Beit She'an in 2018.

Biography
Levy was born in Beit She'an, the second child of Likud politician David Levy. After doing his IDF national service in the paratroopers, he became assistant to the mayor of Ramat Yishai. In 1989, he was elected to Beit She'an City Council as part of the Lev faction, and served as Deputy Mayor between 1992 and 1998. In 2002, he was injured in a terrorist attack on the city's branch of the Likud party. In the same year, he became the city's mayor, serving until 2013.

Prior to the 2015 Knesset elections, he was placed 18th on the Likud list. However, in March 2015, he was charged with environmental violations during his time as mayor. He was elected to the Knesset as Likud won 30 seats, and was appointed Deputy Minister of Construction on 14 June.

In the October 2018 municipal elections, Levy was elected Mayor of Beit She'an. He subsequently left the Knesset and his deputy ministerial post on 18 November; his Knesset seat was taken by Osnat Mark.

Levy has seven children, and his sister Orly Levy is also a politician, serving as a Member of the Knesset for the Likud.

References

External links

1960 births
Living people
Deputy mayors of places in Israel
Deputy ministers of Israel
Israeli people of Moroccan-Jewish descent
Jewish Israeli politicians
Likud politicians
Mayors of places in Israel
Members of the 20th Knesset (2015–2019)
People from Beit She'an